The 1984–85 Penn Quakers men's basketball team represented the University of Pennsylvania during the 1984–85 NCAA Division I men's basketball season. The Quakers, led by 3rd-year head coach Craig Littlepage, played their home games at The Palestra as members of the Ivy League. They finished the season 13–14, 10–4 in Ivy League play to win the conference championship. They received the Ivy League's automatic bid to the NCAA tournament where they lost in the First Round to No. 2 seed and eventual Final Four participant Memphis State.

Roster

Schedule and results

|-
!colspan=9 style=| Regular season

|-
!colspan=9 style=| NCAA Tournament

References

Penn Quakers men's basketball seasons
Penn
Penn
Penn
Penn